Johannes Laaksonen (born 15 December 1990) is a Finnish footballer who currently plays for KTP. He has also represented the Finnish national football team.

References

1990 births
Living people
Finnish footballers
Finnish expatriate footballers
Veikkausliiga players
Norwegian First Division players
Kotkan Työväen Palloilijat players
FC KooTeePee players
Seinäjoen Jalkapallokerho players
Sandnes Ulf players
IFK Mariehamn players
Association football midfielders
Finland international footballers
Finnish expatriate sportspeople in Norway
Expatriate footballers in Norway
People from Kotka
Sportspeople from Kymenlaakso